Arlene Slavin (born 1942, Brooklyn, New York) is a painter, sculptor, and a print-maker whose practice also includes large-scale public art commissions. Slavin is a 1977 National Endowment for the Arts Grant recipient.

Personal life and education 

Arlene Eisenberg was born on October 26, 1942 in Brooklyn, New York to Sally and Louis Eisenberg.

She studied painting at Cooper Union School of Art and Architecture and earned a Bachelor of Fine Arts degree in 1964.  She received a Masters of Fine Arts from Pratt Institute in 1967.

Slavin lives and works in New York City and Wainscott, New York.

Career 
Slavin takes a multi-discipline approach to her work. A painter, print maker, and sculptor—she has created small scale folding screens as well as numerous large scale outdoor public commissions.

Pattern and decoration 
In the 1970s, Slavin developed a diagonal pencil grid system that served as the base for her geometric abstractions. Using layers of overlapping shimmering color woven into her grid, she painted many large scale works. Slavin's influences are in non-western art including: Japanese folding screens and woodblocks, Indian miniatures, Islamic tile work, and Byzantine mosaics.

Slavin's work aligned with the Pattern and Decoration movement, showing in Pattern and Decoration group exhibitions, most recently at the Museum of Contemporary Art, Los Angeles, California in With Pleasure: Pattern and Decoration in American Art, 1972-1985.

Public art 

Slavin's Public Art  commissions grew out of her painted folding screens. Initially, she constructed the first screens using paper, in the manner of traditional Japanese folding screen artists. Later screens used wood. Always exploring new materials, Slavin turned to laser-cut steel. Steel was a perfect material for ornamental fences, gates and sculpture in the unguarded public space. Her public work also consists of carved glass wind screens, cast concrete sculptures, terrazzo flooring, steel seating and colored polymer window films. 

Slavin developed and installed 28 Public Art projects, including: 

 2006- Island Beach State Park, New Jersey, Fisherman's Rest Facility Steel Sculpture 
2004- Assunpink Wildlife Center, New Jersey, Entry Steel Sculptures 
2002- Chapel Hill Public Art Commission, North Carolina, Stainless Steel Art Benches 
2003- Hoboken Terminal Station, NJ Transit, 8 Carved Glass Windscreen Murals
2001- Temple Israel, Ridgewood, New Jersey, Wall-Painted Sculpture-Donor Wall 
2000- Forest City Ratner, Brooklyn, New York, Ornamental Gates & Fences, Hardy Holzman Pfeiffer Associates 
2000- Hebrew Home & Hospital, West Hartford, Connecticut, Tree of Remembrance, Painted Wall Sculpture 
1999- North Carolina Zoological Park, Asheboro, North Carolina, 4 Large Scale Entry Steel Sculptures 
1999- Middletown Station, NJ Transit, Weathervanes, Fence Embellishments 
1999- The Richard Stockon College of New Jersey, Concrete Gateway Sculptures & Terrazzo Floor 
1999- PS 87 Playground, New York, 3 Concrete Buffalo Sculptures & Ornamental Fencing 
1999- Liberty State Park Station, NJ Transit Paving Insert, Etched Glass, Seating, Tree Gates & Platform Inserts 
1998- Congregation Tifereth Jacob, California, Tree of Life, Painted Steel Sculpture, Signage 
1998- Fort Tryon Park, New York, Steel Animal Art Panels & 7 Gates 
1998- J Hood Wright Park, New York, Gates, Fences, Guardrails & Paving Inserts 
1996- Staten Island Jewish Community Center, Tree of Life, Painted Wall Sculpture Signage 
1995- PS 130 (DeSoto School), New York, Railings, Main Stairway and Steel Wall Sculpture/Member Design Team 
1991- Henry Street Settlement, New York, Steel Fence for Sculpture Garden/Member Design Team 
1989- City of New York Parks and Recreation, Central Park, New York, Steel Bear Sculpture/ Bench, Grant 
1989- Cathedral of St. John the Divine, New York, Cathedral Bestiary, Steel Gates 
1986- Bellevue Hospital Center, New York, Children's Psychiatric Unit, Mural 
1983- Hudson River Museum, New York, Museum Cafe, Hudson River Trilogy, Three Room Dividers 
1983- Albert Einstein School of Medicine, New York, Hospital Lobby, Mural 
1983- Public Art Fund, New York, Chelsea Swimming Pool, Mural

Awards and honors 

 1991- Threshold Foundation Grant for Decorative Gates at Henry Street Settlement
 1977- National Endowment for the Arts Grant in Printmaking

Exhibitions 

Slavin has had a variety of solo and group exhibitions. Her work has been exhibited in the Whitney Biennial and other museums and galleries since the 1970s. In 2015, she installed six sculptures in Pratt Sculpture Park, Brooklyn, New York. The Bronx Museum showed her Intersection Sculpture Series in 2017. She has recently been exhibited at Museum of Contemporary Art, Los Angeles, California in With Pleasure: Pattern and Decoration in American Art, 1972-1985.

Grant panelist 

 1996- NYC Percent for Art/ Public Art- Queens Supreme Courthouse  
 1978- NY State Creative Arts Projects/ Graphics

Collections 

Her works is in various museums and public collections, including:

 Metropolitan Museum of Art, New York, NY
 Brooklyn Museum, Brooklyn, NY
 Fogg Art Museum, Harvard University, Cambridge, MA
 Allen Memorial Art Museum, Oberlin, OH
 University of California, Berkeley Art Gallery, Berkeley, CA
 Smithsonian Institution, Washington D.C
 Norton Museum of Art, Palm Beach, FL
 Portland Museum, Portland, OR
 Neuberger Museum of Art, Purchase, NY
 Heckscher Museum of Art, Yonkers, NY
 Hudson River Museum, Yonkers, NY
 Harry N. Abrams Family Collection, NY
 Radford University Art Museum, Radford, VA
 University of Colorado, Colorado Springs, CO
 Colby College Museum of Art, Waterville, ME
 Skowhegan Art School, ME
 Albert Einstein College of Medicine, Bronx, NY
 Cincinnati Museum of Art, Cincinnati, OH
 Guild Hall of East Hampton, East Hampton, NY
 Orlando Museum of Art, Orlando, FL
 New York Health and Hospital Corporation NY
 The City University of New York, NY
 NYC Department of Parks & Recreation, NY
 Chase Bank, NY
 NJ Transit, NJ
 Stockton University, Galloway, NJ

References 

1942 births
American women painters
American contemporary painters
Living people
20th-century American women artists
21st-century American women artists
Pratt Institute alumni
Cooper Union alumni